Cicadidae, the true cicadas, is the largest family of cicadas, with more than 3,200 species worldwide. The oldest known definitive fossils are from the Paleocene, a nymph from the Cretaceous Burmese amber has been attributed to the family, but could also belong to the Tettigarctidae.

Description 
Cicadas are large insects characterized by their membranous wings, triangular-formation of three ocelli on the top of their heads, and their short, bristle-like antennae.

Life cycle 
Cicadas are generally separated into two categories based on their adult emergence pattern. Annual cicadas remain underground as nymphs for two or more years and the population is not locally synchronized in its development, so that some adults mature each year or in most years. Periodical cicadas also have multiple-year life cycles but emerge in synchrony or near synchrony in any one location and are absent as adults in the intervening years. The most well-known periodical cicadas, genus Magicicada, emerge as adults every 13 or 17 years.

Ecology

Communication 
Cicadas are known for the loud airborne sounds that males of most species make to attract mates. One member of this family, Brevisana brevis, the "shrill thorntree cicada", is the loudest insect in the world, able to produce a song that exceeds 100 decibels. Male cicadas can produce four types of acoustic signals: songs, calls, low-amplitude songs, and disturbance sounds. Unlike members of the order Orthoptera (grasshoppers, crickets, and katydids), who use stridulation to produce sounds, members of Cicadidae produce sounds using a pair of tymbals, which are modified membranes located on the abdomen. In order to produce sound, each tymbal is pulled inwards by a connected muscle, and the deformation of the stiff membrane produces a 'click.'

Reproduction 
Newly emerged cicadas climb up trees and molt into their adult stage, now equipped with wings. Males call to attract females, producing the distinct noisy songs cicadas are known for. Females respond to males with a 'click' made by flicking their wings. Once a male has found a female partner, his call changes to indicate that they are a mating pair.

Higher Classification 
Cicadidae is one of two families within the superfamily Cicadoidea. This superfamily is in the suborder Auchenorrhyncha, containing cicadas, hoppers, and relatives, within the order Hemiptera, the true bugs. There are five subfamilies within Cicadidae: Cicadettinae, Cicadinae, Tettigomyiinae, Tibicininae, and Derotettiginae.

Subfamily Cicadettinae Buckton, 1890
 Tribe Aragualnini Sanborn, 2018
 Tribe Carinetini Distant, 1905
 Tribe Chlorocystini Distant, 1905
 Tribe Cicadatrini Distant, 1905
 Tribe Cicadettini Buckton, 1890
 Tribe Katoini Moulds & Marshall, 2018
 Tribe Lamotialnini Boulard, 1976
 Tribe Nelcyndanini Moulds & Marshall, 2018
 Tribe Pagiphorini Moulds & Marshall, 2018
 Tribe Parnisini Distant, 1905
 Tribe Pictilini Moulds & Hill, 2018
 Tribe Prasiini Matsumura, 1917
 Tribe Taphurini Distant, 1905

Subfamily Cicadinae Latreille, 1802
 Tribe Antankariini Sanborn, 2021
 Tribe Arenopsaltriini Moulds, 2018
 Tribe Ayuthiini Moulds, Lee, and Marshall, 2021
 Tribe Burbungini Moulds, 2005
 Tribe Cicadini Latreille, 1802
 Tribe Cicadmalleuini Boulard & Puissant, 2013
 Tribe Cosmopsaltriini Kato, 1932
 Tribe Cryptotympanini Handlirsch, 1925
 Tribe Cyclochilini Distant, 1904
 Tribe Distantadini Orian, 1963
 Tribe Dundubiini Distant, 1905
 Tribe Durangonini Moulds & Marshall, 2018
 Tribe Fidicinini Distant, 1905
 Tribe Gaeanini Distant, 1905
 Tribe Jassopsaltriini Moulds, 2005
 Tribe Kimberpsaltriini Moulds, Marshall, and Popple, 2021
 Tribe Lahugadini Distant, 1905
 Tribe Leptopsaltriini Moulton, 1923
 Tribe Macrotristriini Moulds, 2018
 Tribe Oncotympanini Ishihara, 1961
 Tribe Platypleurini Schmidt, 1918
 Tribe Plautillini Distant, 1905
 Tribe Polyneurini Amyot & Audinet-Serville, 1843
 Tribe Psaltodini Moulds, 2018
 Tribe Psithyristriini Distant, 1905
 Tribe Sonatini Lee, 2010
 Tribe Tacuini Distant, 1904
 Tribe Talcopsaltriini Moulds, 2008
 Tribe Tamasini Moulds, 2005
 Tribe Thophini Distant, 1904
 Tribe Tosenini Amyot & Audinet-Serville, 1843
 Tribe Zammarini Distant, 1905

Subfamily Tettigomyiinae Distant, 1905
 Tribe Hovanini Sanborn, Moulds & Marshall, 2020
 Tribe Iruanini Boulard, 1983
 Tribe Malagasiini Moulds & Marshall, 2018
 Tribe Tettigomyiini Distant, 1905
 Tribe Ydiellini Boulard, 1973

Subfamily Tibicininae Distant, 1905
 Tribe Citroriginini Sanborn, 2021
 Tribe Chilecicadini Sanborn, 2014
 Tribe Hemidictyini Distant, 1905
 Tribe Platypediini Kato, 1932
 Tribe Sapantangini Sanborn, Moulds, & Marshall, 2020
 Tribe Selymbriini Moulds & Marshall, 2018
 Tribe Tettigadini Distant, 1905
 Tribe Tibicinini Distant, 1905

Subfamily Derotettiginae Moulds, 2019 
 Tribe Derotettigini Moulds, 2019

Notes

See also
 List of Cicadidae genera

References

External links
 
 

 
Cicadas
Auchenorrhyncha families